Gajendra Singh Patel (born 16 February 1975) is an Indian politician. He was elected to the Lok Sabha, lower house of the Parliament of India from Khargone, Madhya Pradesh in the 2019 Indian general election as member of the Bharatiya Janata Party.

References

External links
Official biographical sketch in Parliament of India website

India MPs 2019–present
Lok Sabha members from Madhya Pradesh
Living people
Bharatiya Janata Party politicians from Madhya Pradesh
People from Khargone
People from Barwani
1975 births